Blain is a commune in the Loire-Atlantique department in western France. The commune includes the small town of Blain and the villages of Saint-Émilien-de-Blain and La Chaussée.

Population

International relations
Blain is twinned with the market town of Royal Wootton Bassett, England.

See also
 Château de Blain
 Communes of the Loire-Atlantique department

References

External links
Official site

Communes of Loire-Atlantique